Floing is a municipality in the district of Weiz in the Austrian state of Styria.

Geography
Floing lies in the eastern hills of Styria near the Raben forest.

References

Cities and towns in Weiz District